Wilbur is a neighborhood located within the city of Trenton in Mercer County, New Jersey, United States. It was an independent borough from 1891 to 1898.

Wilbur was incorporated as a borough by an act of the New Jersey Legislature on April 24, 1891, from portions of Hamilton Township, based on the results of a referendum held six days earlier. On February 28, 1898, the borough was annexed by Trenton as the 12th Ward.

References

1891 establishments in New Jersey
1898 disestablishments in New Jersey
Former boroughs in New Jersey
Neighborhoods in Trenton, New Jersey
Populated places disestablished in 1898
Populated places established in 1891